Shafiabad (also Romanized as Shafī‘ābād) is a village in Kenarshahr Rural District, in the Central District of Bardaskan County, Razavi Khorasan Province, Iran. At the 2006 census, its population was 2,035, in 597 families.

References 

Populated places in Bardaskan County